Tha Chana is a district (amphoe) in the north of Surat Thani province of southern Thailand.

History
The district is quite old. Originally named Prasong (ประสงค์), it was a subordinate of mueang Lang Suan. In 1906 it was reassigned to mueang Chaiya, which is now Surat Thani Province. The seat of the district was in current-day Ban Tha Krachai. In 1909 as part of thesaphiban administrative reform most of the tambons were transferred to be administered directly by Phum Riang District, nowadays Chaiya district. The remainder of the district was reduced to a minor district (king amphoe), which then also became a subordinate of Phum Riang District. On 29 June 1919 it was abolished completely.

As the area developed in the following decades, the district was recreated on 1 January 1948 as a minor district. The seat of the minor district was in Ban Talad Nong Wai in tambon Tha Chana, thus the district was also named Tha Chana. On 5 June 1956 it was elevated to full district status.

Etymology
The name Tha Chana means 'harbour of victory' and dates back to the expedition of vice-king Boworn Maha Surasinghanat to the south to beat back a Burmese invasion. During his victorious return in 1785 he founded the temple Wat Khotharam (now named Wat Amphawan), and also created two stele commemorating his victory. One was placed in tambon Wang, the other in tambon Tha Chana.

Geography
Neighboring districts are Chaiya to the south, Phato to the northeast, and Lamae to the north. The latter two districts are in Chumphon province. To the east is the Gulf of Thailand.

Administration

Central administration 
Tha Chana district is divided into six sub-districts (tambons), which are further subdivided into 82 administrative villages (mubans).

Local administration 
There is one sub-district municipality (thesaban tambon) in the district:
 Tha Chana consisting of parts of sub-districts Tha Chana and Samo Thong.

There are six sub-district administrative organizations (SAO) in the district:
 Tha Chana consisting of parts of sub-district Tha Chana.
 Samo Thong consisting of parts of sub-district Samo Thong.
 Prasong consisting of sub-district Prasong.
 Khan Thuli consisting of sub-district Khan Thuli.
 Wang consisting of sub-district Wang.
 Khlong Pha consisting of sub-district Khlong Pha.

References

External links
amphoe.com (Thai)
https://web.archive.org/web/20051108211038/http://www.thachanacity.org/ (Thai)

Tha Chana